Colotis halimede, the yellow patch tip or yellow patch white, is a butterfly in the family Pieridae. It is found in Senegal, Mali, Nigeria, Niger, Sudan, Uganda, Ethiopia, Djibouti, Arabia, Somalia, Kenya, Tanzania and North Africa. The habitat consists of dry savanna.

Adults have a fast flight, and prefer the flowers of Capparis species.  The larvae feed on Capparis and Cadaba species.

Subspecies
Colotis halimede halimede (Senegal, Mali, north-eastern Nigeria, Niger, Sudan, northern Uganda, Ethiopia, Djibouti, western and southern Arabia)
Colotis halimede australis Talbot, 1939 (northern and central Tanzania)
Colotis halimede restricta Talbot, 1939 (Ethiopia, Somalia, Kenya)

References

Butterflies described in 1829
halimede